Anuar Sariyev (born 4 February 1992) is a Kazakhstani Paralympic judoka. He won the silver medal in the men's 60 kg event at the 2020 Summer Paralympics held in Tokyo, Japan.

He also competed in the men's 60 kg event at the 2016 Summer Paralympics held in Rio de Janeiro, Brazil.

References 

Living people
1992 births
Kazakhstani male judoka
Paralympic judoka of Kazakhstan
Paralympic silver medalists for Kazakhstan
Paralympic medalists in judo
Judoka at the 2016 Summer Paralympics
Judoka at the 2020 Summer Paralympics
Medalists at the 2020 Summer Paralympics
Place of birth missing (living people)
21st-century Kazakhstani people